State Flag Day may refer to:

 State Flag Day (Azerbaijan)
 State Flag Day (Tajikistan)
 State Flag and Constitution Day (Turkmenistan)

See also
 Day of the National Flag (Ukraine)
 Flag Day (disambiguation)
 Flag flying day